This article presents a list of the historical events and publications of Australian literature during 1930.

Books 

 Marie Bjelke-Petersen – Monsoon Music
 Jean Devanny
 Bushman Burke
 Devil Made Saint
 Miles Franklin – Ten Creeks Run : A Tale of the Horse and Cattle Stations of the Murrumbidgee
 Arthur Gask – The Shadow of Larose
 Mary Gaunt – Joan of the Pilchard
 Xavier Herbert – Black Velvet
 Norman Lindsay – Redheap
 Lennie Lower – Here's Luck
 Vance Palmer
 Men are Human
 The Passage
 Katharine Susannah Prichard – Haxby's Circus : The Lightest, Brightest Little Show on Earth
 Alice Grant Rosman – The Young and Secret
 E. V. Timms – The Cripple in Black
 Arthur W. Upfield – The Beach of Atonement

Young Adult 

 Alice Grant Rosman – Jock the Scot
 Lilian Turner – There Came a Call

Poetry 

 Mary Gilmore – The Wild Swan : Poems
 S. Elliott Napier – Potted Biographies
 John Shaw Neilson – "The Uneven Player"
 Kenneth Slessor – "Gardens in the Sky"

Drama 

 Sumner Locke Elliott – The Crazy Family
 Louis Esson – The Quest : A Dramatic Legend in Six Scenes

Awards and honours

Literary

Births 

A list, ordered by date of birth (and, if the date is either unspecified or repeated, ordered alphabetically by surname) of births in 1930 of Australian literary figures, authors of written works or literature-related individuals follows, including year of death.

 15 February – Bruce Dawe, poet (died 2020)
 11 March – Geoffrey Blainey, historian
 21 May – Malcolm Fraser, politician and author (died 2015)
 19 June – Anne Deveson, author (died 2016)
 25 November – Brenda Niall, biographer
Unknown date
 Mena Kasmiri Abdullah, short story writer

Deaths 

A list, ordered by date of death (and, if the date is either unspecified or repeated, ordered alphabetically by surname) of deaths in 1930 of Australian literary figures, authors of written works or literature-related individuals follows, including year of birth.

 13 January – Robert Crawford, poet (born 1868)
 28 March – Jean Curlewis, novelist (born 1898)
 2 September – Archibald Strong, poet (born 1876)
25 September – Arthur Way, classical scholar, translator and headmaster (born 1847)

See also 
 1930 in poetry
 List of years in literature
 List of years in Australian literature
 1930 in literature
 1929 in Australian literature
 1930 in Australia
 1931 in Australian literature

References

Literature
Australian literature by year
20th-century Australian literature